Smouldering Fires may refer to:

 Smouldering Fires (novel), novel by Anya Seton
 Smouldering Fires (film), 1925 silent film